Hauntings of Mystery Manor is 2005 point-and-click adventure game. It was a solo project of Cindy Pondillo; her first adventure.

Plot and gameplay 
The player returns to a mansion after 15 years to discover it is inhabited by ghosts.

Critical reception 
Tally-Ho of Just Adventure found it "remarkable" that the game had been developed by one person.  Avsn-Nikki of Adventurespiele noted that the style of music is suited to each individual room. Robert Lacey of Adventure Gamers criticised the game's art, plot, writing, puzzles, and interface.

References 

2005 video games
Point-and-click adventure games
Video games developed in the United States
Windows games
Windows-only games